Alexander Curtis Currier (April 16, 1831 in Readfield, Maine – April 24, 1892 in Hallowell, Maine) was an American architect and designer of cemetery monuments.

He worked as a draftsman for the Hallowell Granite Works. His Hubbard Free Library in Hallowell, Maine was designed to look like an English country church. His Brooks Free Library in Brattleboro, Vermont was demolished in 1971.

He married Ellen E. Peckham, and they had a son, Alger Veasey Currier (1862-1911), who became a painter.

Selected works
 Civil War Monument, Hallowell Village Cemetery, Water Street, Hallowell, Maine, 1868–69, with William Hogan.
 Hubbard Free Library, 115 Second Street, Hallowell, Maine, 1878.
 Brooks Free Library, Brattleboro, Vermont, 1886, demolished 1971.

References

External links
 

1831 births
1892 deaths
Architects from Maine
People from Hallowell, Maine
People from Readfield, Maine
19th-century American architects